Malans is a municipality in the Landquart Region in the Swiss canton of Graubünden.

History
Malans is first mentioned about 840 as in villa Mellanze.  In 956 it was mentioned as Malanz.

Geography

 
Of this area, 39.5% is used for agricultural purposes, while 44.4% is forested. Of the rest of the land, 6.9% is settled (buildings or roads) and the remainder (9.2%) is non-productive (rivers, glaciers or mountains).

The municipality is the capital of the Maienfeld sub-district of the Landquart district, after 2017 it was part of the Landquart Region.  It lies along the old Rhine valley road and the road over the Fadärastein pass into the Prättigau valley.

Demographics
, 7.7% of the population was made up of foreign nationals. Over the last 10 years the population has grown at a rate of 16%. Most of the population speaks German (94.9%), with Romansh being second most common ( 1.3%) and Italian being third ( 0.9%).

, the gender distribution of the population was 49.3% male and 50.7% female.  The age distribution, in Malans is; 281 children or 14.7% of the population are between 0 and 9 years old.  127 teenagers or 6.7% are 10 to 14, and 106 teenagers or 5.6% are 15 to 19.  Of the adult population, 187 people or 9.8% of the population are between 20 and 29 years old.  391 people or 20.5% are 30 to 39, 248 people or 13.0% are 40 to 49, and 229 people or 12.0% are 50 to 59.  The senior population distribution is 146 people or 7.7% of the population are between 60 and 69 years old, 140 people or 7.3% are 70 to 79, there are 42 people or 2.2% who are 80 to 89, and there are 11 people or 0.6% who are 90 to 99.

In the 2007 federal election the most popular party was the SVP which received 35% of the vote.  The next three most popular parties were the SP (31.2%), the FDP (24.9%) and the CVP (7.5%).

The entire Swiss population is generally well educated.  In Malans about 83.8% of the population (between age 25-64) have completed either non-mandatory upper secondary education or additional higher education (either university or a Fachhochschule).

Malans has an unemployment rate of 0.89%.  , there were 166 people employed in the primary economic sector and about 41 businesses involved in this sector.  140 people are employed in the secondary sector and there are 26 businesses in this sector.  286 people are employed in the tertiary sector, with 68 businesses in this sector.

Of the rest of the population,  there are 20 individuals (or about 1.05% of the population) who belong to the Orthodox Church, and there are 18 individuals (or about 0.94% of the population) who belong to another Christian church. There are 16 (or about 0.84% of the population) who are Islamic. There are 8 individuals (or about 0.42% of the population) who belong to another church (not listed on the census), 131 (or about 6.87% of the population) belong to no church, are agnostic or atheist, and 50 individuals (or about 2.62% of the population) did not answer the question.

The historical population is given in the following table:

Heritage sites of national significance
The Rohan-Schanze archeological site and Bothmar Castle with its surrounding buildings and park are listed as Swiss heritage sites of national significance.

Transportation
The municipality has a railway station, on the Landquart–Davos Platz line.

References

External links

Official Web site

 
Cultural property of national significance in Graubünden
Municipalities of Graubünden